Mudrikah ibn Ilyas, was an ancestor of the Islamic prophet Muhammad.

History

"Muhammad was the son of 'Abdullah, b. 'Abdu'I-Muttalib (whose name was Shayba), b. Hashim (whose name was 'Amr), b. Abd Manaf (whose name was al-Mughira), b. Qusayy (whose name was Zayd), b. Kilab, b. Murrah, b. Ka'b, b. Lu'ay, b. Ghalib, b. Fihr, b. Malik, b. al-Nadr, b. Kinana, b. Khuzayma, b. Mudrikah (whose name was 'Amir), b. Ilyas, b. Mudar, b. Nizar, b. Ma'add, b. Adnan, b. Udd (or Udad),....b. Ya'rub, b. Yashjub, b. Qedar, b. Isma'il, b. Ibrahim.      (b. = son of)

Family

Mudar the son of  Nizar, begat two Sons: Ilyas and 'Aylan.lIyas begat three sons: Mudrikah, Tabikha, and Qam'a. Their mother was called Khindif, a Quda'aite woman. The name of Mudrika was 'Amir and the name of Tabikha was Amr.

References

Ancestors of Muhammad
Year of birth missing
Year of death missing